Tiliacora triandra is a species of flowering plant native to mainland Southeast Asia and used particularly in the cuisines of northeast Thailand and Laos. In the Isan dialect of Lao, the language of northeastern Thailand, it is called bai yanang or bai ya nang (ใบย่านาง, literally "yanang leaf"), or simply yanang or ya nang (ย่านาง). In Laos, it is also called bai yanang  (ໃບຢານາງ). In Khmer, it is called voar yeav (វល្លិយាវ). It is a climbing plant with deep green leaves and yellowish flowers, tolerating only very mild frost.

Culinary use
In the Lao Isan culture of northeastern Thailand, the leaves are used in the preparation of kaeng no mai (sometimes called kaeng Lao),photo, after the ethnic Lao majority of northeastern Thailand, is a chili-hot tasting soup contained bamboo shoots, chilis, salt, and sometimes also oyster mushrooms, straw mushrooms, cha-om, or other ingredients.  Generally the leaves are not used whole, but rather a juice (or extract) made from the leaves is used to make the broth, primarily as a thickening agent rather than for its flavor. This juice may be prepared from scratch, from fresh leaves, or purchased in canned form.photo

In Vietnam, the plant is called dây sương sâm, and can be made into a kind of jelly called: "sương sâm", sometimes combined with other ingredients as beverage and desserts.

In Cambodia, it is used as an ingredient in a sour soup called samlar machu.

In Laos and Thailand, the leaves are extracted with water using both hands rubbing on leaves back and forth until all the green part in the leaves are out in the water, this is called nam yanang, meaning "yanang water".  The yanang water is used to make bamboo soup.

References

External links
Yanang page (Thai)
Yanang page (Thai)
Tiliacora triandra page (Vietnamese)

Menispermaceae
Plants described in 1821